Medal "100th anniversary of the Azerbaijani police" (Azerbaijani: "Azərbaycan Polisinin 100 illiyi (1918-2018)" yubiley medalı) is a state award of Azerbaijan. The award was established on October 2, 2017, in accordance with the law numbered 790-VQD.

Description of the medal 
The jubilee medals "The 100th anniversary of the Azerbaijani police 1918-1920" were granted to employees who performed exemplary duties in the internal affairs bodies, achieved high results in the service, veterans, persons taking an active part in combating crime, ensuring public safety, and having special merits in the development of police bodies.

The way of wearing 
The medal "100th anniversary of the Azerbaijani police (1918-2018)" is worn on the left side of the chest and, if there are other orders and medals of the Republic of Azerbaijan, it is placed after the medal "95th anniversary of the Armed Forces of the Republic of Azerbaijan (1918-2013)".

References

External links
Orders and medals of the Republic of Azerbaijan 
Academician Khoshbakht Yusifzadeh awarded the medal "100th anniversary of the Azerbaijani police" 
Azerbaijan to create a new medal 
"Azərbaycan Polisinin 100 illiyi (1918-2018)" Azərbaycan Respublikasının yubiley medalı haqqında ƏSASNAMƏ 
Azərbaycan polisinin 100 illiyi (1918-2018) münasibəti ilə Azərbaycan Respublikasının yubiley medalı təsis edilir. 
Azərbaycan polisinin 100 illiyi ilə bağlı medal təsis edildi 
Azərbaycan Respublikası Dövlət Neft Şirkətinin birinci vitse-prezidenti, akademik Xoşbəxt Yusifzadə "Azərbaycan polisinin 100 illiyi" yubiley medalı ilə təltif edilmişdir 
Azərbaycan polisinin 100 illiyi ilə bağlı medal təsis edildi 

Military awards and decorations of Azerbaijan
Awards established in 2017
2017 establishments in Azerbaijan